General elections were held in Turkey on 20 October 1991, to elect members to the 19th Grand National Assembly. It was the first by the ruling Motherland Party to be contested without its founding leader, Turgut Özal, who had become Turkish president two years previously. The result was a swing against Özal's former party in favour of its fierce centre-right rival, the True Path Party led by Süleyman Demirel. The vote saw two additional parties cross the 10 percent barrier to enter parliament. Necmettin Erbakan and his Welfare Party saw a party of religious background returned for the first time in 14 years. Welfare had a greatly increased share of the vote and took several key provinces, including Istanbul in 1994 local elections. Bülent Ecevit's Democratic Left Party also scraped through to win seven seats. Voter turnout was 83.9%.

Background 
An electoral alliance called the "holy alliance" was formed by the Welfare Party, Nationalist Task Party and Reformist Democracy Party to contest the elections.

Results

References

General elections in Turkey
Turkey
Turkey
General
General election